Scot Davidson  is a Canadian politician, who was elected to the House of Commons of Canada in a by-election on February 25, 2019. He represents the electoral district of York—Simcoe as a member of the Conservative Party of Canada.

Political career 
Scot Davidson, Heather Fullerton, and Jason Verkaik sought the Conservative nomination for the 2019 York—Simcoe federal by-election. In a nomination meeting on October 20, Scot Davidson was declared the Conservative candidate. Davidson won the seat in the by election, and held it in the general election in October.

Electoral record

References

External links

Living people
Conservative Party of Canada MPs
Members of the House of Commons of Canada from Ontario
21st-century Canadian politicians
Year of birth missing (living people)
People from Georgina, Ontario